William Webb Spicer (6 September 1820, Esher, Surrey – 28 April 1879, Notting Hill, London) was an Anglican rector and amateur botanist, economic entomologist, and naturalist. He is known for his 1878 book A Handbook of the Plants of Tasmania, which was the first locally printed handbook for Australian flora.

Biography
William Webb Spicer matriculated on 5 December 1838 at Christ Church, Oxford. He graduated there with B.A. in 1843 and M.A. in 1848.  In 1846 he was ordained an Anglican priest at the Chapel of Farnham Castle in Surrey, by the Bishop of Winchester Charles Sumner. Spicer married in 1849. From 1850 to 1874 he was the rector at Itchen Abbas, Winchester.

While living with his wife from February 1874 to March 1878 in Tasmania, Spicer engaged in church duties and philanthropy, gave lectures on natural history, collected plant specimens, and published several research papers, as well as A Handbook of the Plants of Tasmania.

According to a 1878 Nature review of A Handbook of the Plants of Tasmania:

Spicer was a Fellow of the Royal Microscopical Society. He was also a Fellow of the Royal Society of Tasmania and was elected a Member of the Society's Council in 1877.

Family
William Webb Spicer was the second son of John William Spicer (1789–1862) and Hannah Maria Theresa Webb (1800–1862). On 27 November 1849 in Pirbright, Surrey, W. W. Spicer married Dorothea Halsey (1830–1910). They had four sons and four daughters. In 1870 their daughter Dora Mary Spicer (1852–1923) married Frederick John Simson (1838–1901), whose brother Augustus Simson incurred wounds from a platypus and was the subject of a 1876 paper by W. W. Spicer. Upon his marriage, Frederick Simson changed his surname to Spicer-Simson. In January 1874 Frederick and Dora Spicer-Simson with two children arrived in Hobart, Tasmania. In February 1874 they were joined by William and Dorothea Spicer. Frederick and Dora Spicer-Simson had four sons and six daughters. One of their sons was Geoffrey Spicer-Simson.

Eponyms
 Argentipallium spiceri (F.Muell.) Paul G.Wilson
 Dolicholatirus spiceri

Selected publications

as translator and editor
 ; translation originally published in 1869

References

1820 births
1879 deaths
19th-century English Anglican priests
19th-century British botanists
Alumni of Christ Church, Oxford
Fellows of the Royal Microscopical Society